The following is a list of all notable Gujarati dictionaries.

Gujarati language
Gujarati dictionaries